The 2017–18 season is PEC Zwolle's 8th season of play in the Eredivisie and also its 8th consecutive season in the top flight of Dutch football for women.

Competitions

Friendlies

Eredivisie

Results summary

Results by matchday

Matches

Championship play-off

Results summary

Results by matchday

Matches

KNVB Cup

Statistics

Squad details and appearances

Transfers

In

Out

References

PEC Zwolle seasons
PEC Zwolle Women